Abernant is a community in Carmarthenshire, Wales. The population taken at the 2011 census was 297.

Location 
Abernant is a small hamlet located four miles north west of the traditional county town of Carmarthen.

The community is bordered by the communities of: Cynwyl Elfed; Newchurch and Merthyr; Meidrim; and Trelech, all being in Carmarthenshire.

History & Amenities 
It has a parish church and a small primary school.

Abernant has the oldest and vastest graveyard in Wales.

Abernant is situated near Talog, Bwlchnewydd and Cynwyl Elfed, all of which have more facilities than Abernant.

Abernant used to have a pub and a post office, but due to the ever-decreasing number of residents these no longer exist.

References

Communities in Carmarthenshire
Villages in Carmarthenshire